Longbridge railway station was a railway station in  Longbridge, Birmingham, England, on the Great Western Railway and Midland Railway's joint Halesowen Railway line from Old Hill to Longbridge. Despite closure, the railway station and part of the track remained in situ until the demolition of most of the Longbridge factory in 2006. The station should not be confused with the current station that was built in 1978, and is located on the Cross City Line.

References

External links
 Austin & Longbridge Railways

Disused railway stations in Birmingham, West Midlands
Railway stations in Great Britain opened in 1915
Railway stations in Great Britain closed in 1960
Former Midland Railway stations
Former Great Western Railway stations